In mathematics, Ramanujan's congruences are some remarkable congruences for the partition function p(n). The mathematician Srinivasa Ramanujan discovered the congruences

This means that:

 If a number is 4 more than a multiple of 5, i.e. it is in the sequence
 4, 9, 14, 19, 24, 29, . . .
 then the number of its partitions is a multiple of 5.

 If a number is 5 more than a multiple of 7, i.e. it is in the sequence
 5, 12, 19, 26, 33, 40, . . .
 then the number of its partitions is a multiple of 7.

 If a number is 6 more than a multiple of 11, i.e. it is in the sequence
 6, 17, 28, 39, 50, 61, . . .
 then the number of its partitions is a multiple of 11.

Background 

In his 1919 paper, he proved the first two congruences using the following identities (using q-Pochhammer symbol notation):

He then stated that "It appears there are no equally simple properties for any moduli involving primes other than these".

After Ramanujan died in 1920, G. H. Hardy extracted proofs of all three congruences from an unpublished manuscript of Ramanujan on p(n) (Ramanujan, 1921). The proof in this manuscript employs the Eisenstein series.

In 1944, Freeman Dyson defined the rank function and conjectured the existence of a crank function for partitions that would provide a combinatorial proof of Ramanujan's congruences modulo 11. Forty years later, George Andrews and Frank Garvan found such a function, and proved the celebrated result that the crank simultaneously "explains" the three Ramanujan congruences modulo 5, 7 and 11.

In the 1960s, A. O. L. Atkin of the University of Illinois at Chicago discovered additional congruences for small prime moduli. For example:

Extending the results of A. Atkin, Ken Ono in 2000 proved that there are such Ramanujan congruences modulo every integer coprime to 6. For example, his results give

Later Ken Ono conjectured that the elusive crank also satisfies exactly the same types of general congruences. This was proved by his Ph.D. student Karl Mahlburg in his 2005 paper Partition Congruences and the Andrews–Garvan–Dyson Crank, linked below. This paper won the first Proceedings of the National Academy of Sciences Paper of the Year prize.

A conceptual explanation for Ramanujan's observation was finally discovered in January 2011  by considering the Hausdorff dimension of the following  function in the l-adic topology:

It is seen to have dimension 0 only in the cases where ℓ = 5, 7 or 11 and since the partition function can be written as a linear combination of these functions this can be considered a formalization and proof of Ramanujan's observation.

In 2001, R.L. Weaver gave an effective algorithm for finding congruences of the partition function, and tabulated 76,065 congruences. This was extended in 2012 by F. Johansson to 22,474,608,014 congruences, one large example being

See also 
 Tau-function, for which there are other so-called Ramanujan congruences
 Rank of a partition
 Crank of a partition

References

External links

 Dyson's rank, crank and adjoint. A list of references.

Theorems in number theory
Srinivasa Ramanujan
Equivalence (mathematics)